Beautiful Liar is the debut mini-album by South Korean boy band VIXX's first official sub-unit VIXX LR. The EP was released on August 17, 2015 under the label of Jellyfish Entertainment.

Background
On August 7, 2015, Jellyfish Entertainment released a video trailer on VIXX's official website after a mysterious countdown with a silhouette of VIXX's last special album Boys' Record. As time went by, members of VIXX disappeared until finally only Leo and Ravi were left behind, which caused fans to speculate that it meant another comeback for all six members. A video trailer of VIXX LR was then revealed. After a series of image and video teasers, VIXX LR was confirmed by Jellyfish Entertainment to be VIXX's first official sub-unit composed of rapper Ravi and vocalist Leo. Following the release of the music video on VIXX's official YouTube channel, the EP was officially released on August 17, 2015.

Composition
The EP consists of five tracks and one instrumental all of which are written and composed by either Ravi or Leo as the composer duo of VIXX. The title track on the album, "Beautiful Liar", was written by Ravi, Kim Ji-hyang and Rhymer and composed by Ravi and MELODESIGN with arrangement by ASSBRASS and Cho Yong-ho, both Leo and Ravi provided the vocals to this track as with the second track "Remember" which was written entirely by Ravi and arranged by Kiggen. The third track "Words to Say"; Leo's Solo was written entirely by himself and arranged by MELODESIGN. The fourth track "Ghost"; Ravi's Solo was written entirely by himself and arranged by himself and Cho Yong-ho. The fifth track "My Light" was written by Leo and Ravi and composed by Leo and MELODESIGN with arrangement also by MELODESIGN, all of VIXX provided the vocals to this track.

Music video
In the rather symbolic and emotional music video for "Beautiful Liar", the story is about a man; Leo and a woman breaking up, on the way out Leo gets a wedding invitation from his ex-girlfriend. Leo is shown with two different personalities; the truth and the lie.  The lie being Leo who wants to let his ex-girlfriend go and forget her and the truth being the physical manifestation of Ravi who is trying to keep a hold of her, wanting and needing her to stay. Throughout the music video the truth (Ravi) and the lie (Leo) are at odds with each other with their conflicting emotions, until finally Leo overcomes Ravi and is left alone admitting that he is a cowardly liar.

Promotion
VIXX LR began their promotions with their first showcase for Beautiful Liar at Yes24 Muv Hall in Seoul′s Mapo-gu on August 17, 2015. The duo then started promoting and performing from August 18 on various music programs including SBS MTV's The Show, KBS's Music Bank, MBC's Show! Music Core, SBS's Inkigayo, Mnet's,  M! Countdown and MBC Music's Show Champion. On September 1 VIXX LR gained their first ever music show win since their debut on SBS MTV's The Show with 9,464 of the votes making them have the second-highest all time score, behind their parent group VIXX with "Error". On September 4, 2015 VIXX LR wrapped up their three-week promotional cycle for Beautiful Liar on KBS2's Music Bank with a goodbye stage performance. In January 2016 it was announced that VIXX LR will be holding their first Japan showcase tour for Beautiful Liar.

Showcase Tour

Track listing
The credits are adapted from the official homepage of the group.

Chart performance

Awards and nominations

Awards

Music program awards

Release history

See also
 List of K-pop albums on the Billboard charts

References

External links
 
 Beautiful Liar - EP by VIXX LR on iTunes

2015 debut EPs
VIXX albums
Korean-language EPs
Jellyfish Entertainment EPs
Stone Music Entertainment EPs